A potter's field, paupers' grave or common grave is a place for the burial of unknown, unclaimed or indigent people.  "Potter's field" is of Biblical origin, referring to Akeldama (meaning field of blood in Aramaic), stated to have been purchased after Judas Iscariot's suicide by the high priests of Jerusalem with the coins that had been paid to Judas for his identification of Jesus. The priests are stated to have acquired it for the burial of strangers, criminals, and the poor, the coins paid to Judas being considered blood money. Prior to Akeldama's use as a burial ground, it had been a site where potters collected high-quality, deeply red clay for the production of ceramics, thus the name potters' field.

Origin

The term "potter's field" comes from Matthew 27:3–27:8 in the New Testament of the Bible, in which Jewish priests take 30 pieces of silver returned by a remorseful Judas:

The site referred to in these verses is traditionally known as Akeldama, in the valley of Hinnom, which was a source of potters' clay. After the clay was removed, such a site would be left unusable for agriculture, being full of trenches and holes, thus becoming a graveyard for those who could not be buried in an orthodox cemetery. 

The author of Matthew was drawing on earlier Biblical references to potters' fields. The passage continues, with verses 9 and 10:

This is based on a quotation from Zechariah. However, Matthew attributes the quote to Jeremiah. The author of Matthew may have been mistaken. There are two other possible reasons for the reference. That field is a symbol of hope, not despair as mentioned in Matthew, and the price is 17 pieces of silver. The author of Matthew could have combined the words of Zechariah and Jeremiah, while only citing the "major" prophet. Secondly, "Jeremiah" was sometimes used to refer to the Books of the Prophets in toto as "The Law" is sometimes used to refer to Moses' five books – Genesis through Deuteronomy, the Pentateuch.

Craig Blomberg suggests that the use of the blood money to buy a burial ground for foreigners in Matthew 27:7 may hint at the idea that "Jesus' death makes salvation possible for all the peoples of the world, including the Gentiles." Other scholars do not read the verse as referring to Gentiles, but rather to Jews who are not native to Jerusalem.

Examples
 Blue Plains, in the Anacostia area of Washington, D.C., contains remains of executed international spies including Nazi spies from Operation Pastorius.
 Cimetière de Laval, near Montreal, Quebec
 Eloise Cemetery in Westland, Michigan was used by the Eloise hospital complex; some 7,000 people were buried there between 1894 and 1948.
 Golden Gate Cemetery in San Francisco, California was used from 1870 to 1909, with some 29,000 burials in sections, one of which was a potter's field.
 Hart Island in the Bronx is New York City's current potter's field, and one of the largest cemeteries in the United States with at least 800,000 burials.
 Holt Cemetery in New Orleans contains the remains of known and unknown early jazz musicians, including Charles "Buddy" Bolden. The battered remains of Robert Charles, at the center of the 1900 New Orleans race riot were briefly interred there, then dug up and incinerated. It is located next to Delgado Community College.
 Hudson County Burial Grounds
 Lincoln Park, on Chicago's North Side, found its origin in the 1840s as Chicago City Cemetery. The southernmost portion of the cemetery, where one may now find a number of baseball fields (north of LaSalle Dr., west of North Avenue Beach), was the location of the City Cemetery potter's field from 1843 to 1871. More than 15,000 people, including 4,000 Confederate soldiers, were buried here on marshy land near the water's edge. The baseball fields have occupied these grounds since 1877.
 Madison Square Park, Washington Square Park and Bryant Park in New York City originated as potter's fields.
 Music Hall in Cincinnati, Ohio was built over a nineteenth-century potter's field.
 Potter's Field (Omaha) in Omaha, Nebraska
 Queen Lane Apartments. Work on the project was delayed by the discovery of a potter's field on an adjacent plot.
 Shockoe Hill African Burying Ground in Richmond, Virginia, came to be labeled as Potter's Field on maps in the 1870s. It was/is likely the largest burial ground for free people of color and the enslaved in the United States. The number of estimated interments made between 1816 and 1879 is upwards of 22,000.
 Strangers' Burying Ground, Toronto open from 1826 to 1855 with total 6,685 burials.
 Washington Park (Albany) was the site of the State Street Burying Grounds, a municipal cemetery which included a potter's field. Some maps identify the section as the "strangers" burial ground.
 Washington Square (Philadelphia)
 Puticuli, an ancient Roman mass grave for poor people and waste.
 The Green Bay, WI Potter's Field was neglected and forgotten until 2014, when VFW Post 9677 launched a fundraising campaign, spruced up the area, and identified many of the 296 people buried there from 1853 to 1973. The City Public Works now maintains the property.

Popular culture 

 In Theodore Dreiser's novel Sister Carrie, after Hurstwood kills himself he is buried in the Potter cemetery.
 In the episode "It's a Miserable Life" of The Golden Girls Rose Nylund is filled with guilt after their neighbor, Frida Claxton dies of a heart attack after Rose berates her for opposing the saving a 200-year-old oak tree. Rose says to Dorothy Zbornak "She'll be buried in an unmarked grave on a potter's field."
 Hart Island, New York, the Potter's Field in New York City, is featured in the film Don't Say a Word. The independent documentary Hart Island: An American Cemetery by Melinda Hunt also concerns Hart Island.
 It is now confirmed that the child actor Bobby Driscoll (Peter Pan, 1953) is buried in Potter's Field on Hart Island in New York, being unidentified at the time of his burial. This is also loosely referenced in Law & Order: Criminal Intent in the episode "Blasters".
 In the HBO drama Oz, "Potter's Field" is the name for the cemetery where deceased prisoners with no next-of-kin or whose remains are unclaimed are buried.
 In the 1953 film Pickup on South Street, the character Moe Williams' (Thelma Ritter) sole motivation for work is to save money in order to prevent a possible burial in Potter's Field.
 In Victor Hugo's Notre-Dame de Paris, Esmeralda is buried in Potter's Field.
 From Potter's Field is a novel by Patricia Cornwell.
 The Potter's Field is the name of the seventeenth chronicle in the series of  Brother Cadfael detective books by Ellis Peters, later turned into a television episode.
 Potter's Field is the title of a three-issue limited comic book series (plus a one shot) written by Mark Waid and published by Boom! Studios about an anonymous investigator who takes it upon himself to discover the identities of those buried on Hart Island.
 A potter's field is featured in Neil Gaiman's novel The Graveyard Book. One of the characters, Liza Hempstock, is a witch who was buried in a potter's field next to Nobody Owens' graveyard.
 Potter's Field is an album by the rock band 12 Stones.
 "No Eagle Lies in Potter's Field" is the name of a song by the rock band On A Pale Horse.
 "Potter's Field" is the name of a song by the American thrash metal band Anthrax from their 1993 album Sound of White Noise.
 Railroad Earth has a song called "Potter's Field" on their self-titled 2010 album.
 "Potter's Field" is a song by alternative band Mono Inc.
 Tom Waits makes references to Potter's Field in several of his songs.
 On the title track to Johnny Cash's album American IV: The Man Comes Around, the lyrics include a reference to "the potter's ground" as a metaphor for dying without salvation.
 In the long-running MUD GemStone IV, an area called the "Potter's Field" is the primary spawn area for zombies.  The area's descriptions are, indeed, of a long-disused graveyard for the indigent and unknown.
 Similarly, in City of Villains a massive graveyard called "Potter's Field" is a place where zombies spawn, while magicians use the area for necromantic rituals.
 American bluegrass band Blue Highway mentions a potter's field as Ottie's final resting place in the song "Clay and Ottie".
 The name of the American noise rock band A Place to Bury Strangers describes a potter's field.
 The Venture Compound in The Venture Brothers has a potter's field containing dead henchmen, as well as the bodies of a succession of clones Dr. Thaddeus Venture had made of his accident- and danger-prone sons.  Hank and Dean Venture remembered their father telling them to avoid a spooky house on the edge of their property, "Mr. Potter's house".  However the actual inhabitant, a reclusive scientist named Ben, told Dean Venture that no one named "Mr. Potter" had ever lived there, and theorized that Dean's father had actually called it "potter's field", because he and his father used the field in front of the house to bury the massive number of supervillains and henchmen who died on the compound over the decades, and hide the clone bodies to prevent others (including the Venture boys themselves) from learning that the original Hank and Dean were dead.
 The term was used by Saul Berenson in episode 7 of the series Homeland to describe where Raqim Faisel would be buried.
 The television series Over the Garden Wall features a town called Pottsfield, which is the residence of dead spirits.
 In the novella Prisoner 489 by Joe R. Lansdale, in the potter's field behind the prison the headstones are only marked with the number in the order the condemned were executed.
 In the film It's a Wonderful Life, Potter's Field is Henry F. Potter's housing development intended for those too poor to live in his slums. He eventually loses Potter's Field tenants to George Bailey's nicer, more affordable Bailey Park.
 Joanna Newsom makes reference to the term in the song Sapokanikan, from her album Divers.
 "The Potter’s Field" is the title of one of the episodes from the seventh TV series of Inspector Montalbano, based on the Sicilian detective novel of the same name by Andrea Camilleri.
 In the tenth episode of the fifth season of Person of Interest, "When the World Went Away" the character Root makes reference to "the most principled corpse in Potter's Field." After her death, she is briefly interred in one (presumably Hart Island) before being disinterred in a search for her modified cochlear implant.
 The third act's climax of Gideon's Sword by Douglas Preston and Lincoln Child takes place on Hart Island. The book mentions the burial fields extensively. Preston has a blog post in their website about his own experience at Hart Island during a research trip.
 Potter's Field is the location where Mike "Meathead" Stivic suggests to his father in law Archie Bunker to bury his Cousin Oscar in an episode of All In The Family.
 In the 2017 musical, The View UpStairs, the character Patrick refers to being buried in a Potter's field after being killed in the arson attack on the UpStairs Lounge.
 The opening scene of Season 2 of Pose was set at the Hart Island Potter's field in New York, where they were performing quarantined burials during the onset of the HIV/AIDS epidemic.

See also
 Akeldama
 Boot Hill
 Mass grave
 Pauper's funeral

References

External links

 New York City's Hart Island Potter's Field 
 Haceldama – From the Catholic Encyclopedia
 NYC's Potter's field on Hart Island, by CBS Television

Death customs
Cemeteries